Kotupna is a locality in northern Victoria, Australia in the local government area of the Shire of Moira. The post office opened on 17 October 1881, and closed on 30 June 1993.

References

External links

Towns in Victoria (Australia)
Shire of Moira